The Immediate Geographic Region of Sete Lagoas is one of the 10 immediate geographic regions in the Intermediate Geographic Region of Belo Horizonte, one of the 70 immediate geographic regions in the Brazilian state of Minas Gerais and one of the 509 of Brazil, created by the National Institute of Geography and Statistics (IBGE) in 2017.

Municipalities 

It comprises 19 municipalities:

 Araçaí
 Baldim    

 Cachoeira da Prata

 Caetanópolis     

 Capim Branco     
 Conceição do Mato Dentro    
 Congonhas do Norte 

 Cordisburgo    
 Fortuna de Minas  
 Funilândia    
 Inhaúma
 Jequitibá   
 Matozinhos 
 Morro do Pilar  
 Paraopeba     
 Prudente de Morais 
 Santana de Pirapama    
 Santana do Riacho     
 Sete Lagoas

References 

Geography of Minas Gerais